From the anthroposophy teachings of Rudolf Steiner. "Pneumatosophy" (wisdom of the spirit) can be seen as part of his teachings on spiritual science and approaches the human spirit in terms of truth and error and the meaning and the effects of imagination, intuition, and inspiration. In some cases it will be difficult to understand the context between the subject matter and what is here termed pneumatosophy. Pneuma (Greek) literally "breath" or "wind". In the Bible is usually translated as "spirit". The suffix sophy stands for knowledge.

See also
Esoteric Christianity
Mysticism
Psychosophy
Theosophy

Resources
http://www.doyletics.com/arj/psychbsp.htm

Rudolf Steiner
Anthroposophy